The Spendthrift (German: Der Verschwender) is a 1964 Austrian historical film directed by Kurt Meisel and starring Christiane Hörbiger, Wolfgang Gasser and Walther Reyer. It is an adaptation of Ferdinand Raimund's play of the same name.

Cast

References

Bibliography 
 Goble, Alan. The Complete Index to Literary Sources in Film. Walter de Gruyter, 1999.

External links 
 

1964 films
1960s historical musical films
1960s musical fantasy films
Austrian historical musical films
1960s German-language films
Films directed by Kurt Meisel
Films set in the 19th century
Austrian films based on plays